"Waterfalls" is a Paul McCartney ballad from his first solo album after Wings, McCartney II. The song has a minimalist sound, with McCartney only playing a Fender Rhodes electric piano and a synthesizer and singing, and a short solo performed on acoustic guitar.

"Waterfalls" was released as a single with "Check My Machine" as its B-Side and reached chart position  in the UK. In the US, however, it was his first single ever to miss the Billboard Hot 100 chart, only reaching  despite being the follow-up to the  hit "Coming Up".  In 2013, Rolling Stone rated it the  all-time Paul McCartney post-Beatles song, describing how it contrasted with Wings' prior single.

Billboard described "Waterfalls" as having "a subtle oriental flavor" and "appropriately sparse" instrumentation, and described McCartney's vocal performance as "inimitable" and "creamy."  Cash Box called it a "whimsical ballad," stating that it has an "almost dirge-like melody." Record World said that "Stately keyboards surround [McCartney's] boyish falsetto for pop-A/C appeal."

When questioned on singles he wished were more successful, McCartney stated, "There's quite a few, actually. ... 'Waterfalls', I think is nice." He also commented that TLC's single "Waterfalls" carries elements of his song.

McCartney also said of his song:

Charts

Personnel

"Waterfalls"
 Paul McCartney – vocals, Fender rhodes, synthesizer, acoustic guitar solo

"Check My Machine"
Paul McCartney - vocals, banjo, bass, electric guitar, keyboards, synthesizer, drums, shaker, percussion

Other versions
Sloan recorded a more uptempo version of the song on the McCartney tribute album Listen To What The Man Said.

References

Paul McCartney songs
1980 singles
Songs written by Paul McCartney
Columbia Records singles
Parlophone singles
Song recordings produced by Paul McCartney
Music published by MPL Music Publishing
1980 songs
1980s ballads
Rock ballads